The Corruptor: The Soundtrack is a soundtrack to James Foley's 1999 action film The Corruptor. It was released on February 23, 1999, via Jive Records, composed of 17 original songs. Production was handled by Dame Grease, Erick Sermon, Pimp C, Dave Mezee, Daven "Prestige" Vanderpool, DJ Battlecat, Havoc, Marley Marl, Mike "Mr. Fortune" Fortunato, Night & Day, Omar "Amarreto" Glover, Swizz Beatz, The Legendary Traxster, Tony "T-Lo" Aviles, William "Ill Will" Broady and Yogi "Sugar Bear" Graham, with Dana Sano, Lori Silfen and Toby Emmerich serving as executive producers.

It features contributions from Keith Murray, UGK, Mobb Deep, Beanie Sigel, Big Stan, B-Legit, Bounty Killer, Buckshot, Caffeine, Cam'ron, DMX, E-40, Jane Blaze, Jay-Z, Kasino, Killah Priest, KRS-One, Memphis Bleek, Mic Vandalz, Mil, Mystikal, Night & Day, Redman, Rev. Run, Sauce Money, Spice 1, The L.O.X., Too $hort, Truck Turner, Vigilante and Carter Burwell.

The album peaked at number 44 on the Billboard 200 and at number 9 on the Top R&B Albums charts in the United States.

Carter Burwell's score album entitled The Corruptor (Original Motion Picture Score) was recorded at Right Track Studio in New York and released on March 9, 1999, via Varèse Sarabande.

Track listing 

Sample credits
Track 2 contains a sample "Another Execution" by Above The Law
Track 4 contains a sample of "Love Serenade" by Barry White
Track 5 contains a sample of "Street Tough Livin' On The City" by Willie Hutch
Track 9 contains a sample of "Warning" by Notorious B.I.G. and "Hell On Earth" by Mobb Deep

Charts

References

External links

Hip hop soundtracks
1999 soundtrack albums
Action film soundtracks
Jive Records soundtracks
Albums produced by Dame Grease
Albums produced by Marley Marl
Albums produced by Swizz Beatz
Albums produced by Erick Sermon
Albums produced by Havoc (musician)
Albums produced by Battlecat (producer)
Albums produced by The Legendary Traxster